Barhaj is a constituency of the Uttar Pradesh Legislative Assembly covering the city of Barhaj in the Deoria district of Uttar Pradesh, India. Barhaj is one of five assembly constituencies in the Bansgaon Lok Sabha constituency. Since 2008, this assembly constituency is numbered 342 amongst 403 constituencies. Bharatiya Janta Party candidate Deepak Mishra won in last Assembly election of 2022 Uttar Pradesh Legislative Elections.

Election results

2022

Members of Legislative Assembly

References

External links
 

Assembly constituencies of Uttar Pradesh
Deoria district